"Springsteen" is a song co-written and recorded by American country music artist Eric Church. It was released on February 21, 2012 as the third single from his third studio album Chief. Church wrote this song with Jeff Hyde and Ryan Tyndell. The song was inspired by a memory of a girl and another artist's song, but he chose to center it around an idol of his, Bruce Springsteen, and tells the story of a teenage romance.

"Springsteen" was received with critical acclaim for its melody and strong lyrics making it one of the top country songs of 2012. The single reached number 19 on the Billboard Hot 100, becoming Church's first song to enter the Top 20 on that chart. The song also topped the US Billboard Hot Country Songs. Outside of the United States, the song peaked at 28 on the Canadian Hot 100. "Springsteen" was certified six-times platinum by the Recording Industry Association of America (RIAA). The song was nominated for two Grammy Awards on December 12, 2012, but failed to win any of the awards at the ceremony in 2013.

The accompanying music video was directed by Peter Zavadil and premiered on April 13, 2012 on Maxim.com. The video features Eric Church playing instruments in a suburban neighborhood, while a couple is shown going through the ups and downs of a relationship.

Composition
"Springsteen" features drums and a synthesizer, along with live instrumentation from the guitar and keyboard. The song notably lacks both the fiddle and steel guitar, which are staples of country music. Eric Church uses his voice throughout the piece to convey emotion, with his pitch and tone changing from verse to verse. The song is composed of two verses with a chorus that is repeated several times. The song is set in the key of D major with a main chord pattern of D-G-Bm-A and a vocal range of A3-E5.

Eric Church wrote the song with Jeff Hyde and Ryan Tyndell. The basis for the song came from a memory of a girl and involved another artist's song. Church chose to base the song around an idol of his, Bruce Springsteen, whose career he admires. During the course of the song, Church makes several allusions to Springsteen; he mentions the Springsteen songs "Born to Run", "Born in the USA", "Glory Days", and "I'm on Fire". While being named after Springsteen and making several references to him, the song however tells the story of a teenage romance. Bruce Springsteen later wrote Eric a letter saying how he and his family enjoyed the song and that he hoped that Eric and he would cross paths soon.

Critical reception
"Springsteen" received critical acclaim from many music critics. Billy Dukes of Taste of Country gave the song five stars out of five, calling it "the best song from one of 2011's top country albums." Matt Bjorke of Roughstock also gave the song five stars of five, writing that "the strong, sing-a-long lyrics and driving, percussive melody brings Eric Church to an accessibility that he's previously never had." Noah Eaton of Country Universe gave it an A−, saying that it is "a gorgeous, bittersweet anthem-to-be that will likely leave even some more hardened hearts simultaneously smile and cry listening." Eaton went on further to say that this song would propel Church's career to the next level. American Songwriter chose the song for its Lyric of the Week feature, for the week of June 11, 2012. The song was nominated for two Grammy Awards – Best Country Solo Performance and Best Country Song – on December 12, 2012, but failed to win any of the awards at the ceremony in 2013.

Thom Jerek of AllMusic said the song had "a clever, if somewhat cloying, tune, but it gets the feeling across in spades." The A.V. Club reviewer Steven Hyden claims that Church "is just as effective on slower, more thoughtful songs like "Springsteen" and that the song "[reflects] reflecting on music’s power to revive forgotten emotions from the past." Bruce Springsteen himself took note of Church's music, specifically the song "Springsteen", and wrote Church a note on the back of a setlist. Church received the letter from Springsteen's after a show on August 19, 2012. In the note, Springsteen explained his and his family's love of the song and that he hoped to have their paths cross at some point. Church was surprised when receiving the note and said that "it’s a long note, takes up the entire back page of this setlist for a show that lasted three hours and 47 minutes."

Rolling Stone ranked "Springsteen" at #58 on their list of the 100 Greatest Country Songs of All Time, the fifth ranking for a song released in the 21st century behind Carrie Underwood's "Before He Cheats" (#57), Brad Paisley's "Alcohol" (#54), Kacey Musgraves' "Follow Your Arrow" (#39) and Taylor Swift's "Mean" (#24). The magazine later ranked the song #391 on its 2021 list of The 500 Greatest Songs of All Time.

Music video
The song's accompanying music video was directed by Peter Zavadil and premiered on April 13, 2012 on Maxim.com. The video was later made available for purchase through iTunes on April 20, 2012. The video is set in a suburban neighborhood located in Murfreesboro, TN and work on the video began in early March 2012. Church allowed all the neighborhood kids to make cameos in the film. The video was later nominated for Music Video of the Year for 2012 Country Music Awards; however, it lost out to Toby Keith's "Red Solo Cup" for the award.

The music video begins with a girl talking about what she wants in her next boyfriend while on some bleachers. After her monologue is over, the video cuts between shots of Eric Church and scenes of the girl and a boy during various high points and low points in their relationship. Church is seen throughout the video either playing with his band in a garage, in the middle of the street on a piano, or walking through the streets with an American flag around his shoulders while singing. The video ends without showing whether the girl and boy ended up together.

Chart and sales performance
"Springsteen" debuted at number 52 on the US Billboard Hot Country Songs chart for the week of February 18, 2012. On June 23, 2012, it later became Eric Church's second number one single on the US Billboard Hot Country Songs after "Drink in My Hand" in 2011.  The record reached two million copies sold in January 2013 and has gone on to be certified triple platinum by the Recording Industry Association of America (RIAA). The song has sold 2,783,000 copies in the US as of August 2016.

On the Canadian Hot 100, the single reached a peak of 28 on the charts before falling down the rankings. On September 5, 2012 sales for the song in Canada received gold and platinum certifications, and on July 11, 2013 it achieved double platinum status with over 80,000 records sold.

Charts and certifications

Weekly charts

Year-end charts

Certifications

References

2012 singles
2012 songs
Country ballads
2010s ballads
Eric Church songs
EMI Records singles
Songs written by Eric Church
Music videos directed by Peter Zavadil
Song recordings produced by Jay Joyce
Songs written by Jeff Hyde
Songs written by Ryan Tyndell
Bruce Springsteen
Songs about musicians
Songs about nostalgia